The 2011–12 snooker season was a series of snooker tournaments played between 1 June 2011 and 7 May 2012. The Brazil Masters became the first professional event held in South America, and the Australian Goldfields Open the first ranking event in Australia. The World Cup was held again after 1996. At the end of the season Ronnie O'Sullivan was named the World Snooker Player of the Year and the Snooker Writers Player of the Year, Judd Trump the Fans Player of the Year and Luca Brecel the Rookie of the Year. Stuart Bingham received the "Performance of the Year" for winning his first ranking event, the Australian Goldfields Open. Stephen Hendry's maximum break at the World Championship received "The Magic Moment" award. Walter Donaldson, Mark Williams, John Higgins and Ronnie O'Sullivan were inducted into the Hall of Fame.

New professional players
Countries
 
 
 
 
 
 
 
 
 
 
 

Note: new in this case means that these players were not on the 2010/2011 professional Main Tour. 

NGB nominations

WPBSA Wildcard

Calendar 
The following table outlines the results and dates for all the ranking and major invitational events.

Official rankings

Seeding revision 1

Seeding revision 2

Seeding revision 3

Seeding revision 4

World ranking points

Points distribution 
2011/2012 Points distribution for world ranking and minor-ranking events

Notes

References

External links

2011
Season 2012
Season 2011